Cynthia Chenault (born January 5, 1937) is an American television actress and producer/writer active from the mid-1950s to the present. She used the screen name Cindy Robbins in her acting credits.

Early years
Robbins was born in Hammond, Louisiana. Her mother operated a dancing school in Pascagoula, Mississippi, and Robbins began dancing at age five. When she was eight years old, her family moved to California. When she was a student at Glendale High School, her career plans changed from dancing to acting. In 1952, she was the school's representative at an annual drama festival. She has four sisters.

Career

Stage
Robbins's entertainment debut came in Ken Murray's Blackouts when she was 11 years old. On Broadway, she portrayed Molly Belmont in By the Beautiful Sea (1954), and Janice Dawson in Happy Town (1959). She also had a lead role in The Vacant Lot at the La Jolla Playhouse.

Television 
Her first acting role on television was in 1955, in the episode Moonfire of the television western series Brave Eagle. In 1960, Robbins appeared as a ballerina in the "Bullets and Ballet" episode of Tightrope!.

Her last acting role in television was on the television comedy series McHale's Navy in 1964.

Her best-known role was that of Carol Porter, one of the daughters in the one-season situation comedy The Tom Ewell Show (1960–61). She also made two guest appearances on Perry Mason, including the role of Teddi Hart in the 1960 episode "The Case of the Treacherous Toupee" and the role of Mabel Richmond in the 1962 episode "The Case of Melancholy Marksman".

Her other television work consisted of appearances in comedy shows (Ensign O'Toole, Father Knows Best, The Adventures of Ozzie and Harriet, Leave It To Beaver), McHale's Navy & military/action shows (Steve Canyon, Whirlybirds, Harbor Command), westerns (Wagon Train, The Tall Man), and dramas (Westinghouse Desilu Playhouse, Tightrope, Dragnet).

Film 
She appeared in several films from 1957 to 1959:
 I Was a Teenage Werewolf (1957) playing Pearl, Vic's Girl
 Dino (1957), a Sal Mineo drama, playing Sylvia
 Rockabilly Baby (1957), a film about family secrets and small-town life (featuring  Les Brown and His Band of Renown), playing Vougette #1
 Gunsight Ridge (1957), a Joel McCrea Western, playing the Bride
 This Earth Is Mine (1959), a Rock Hudson drama about California wine country, playing Buz Dietrick

Producing/writing 
In the mid-1980s, she produced/wrote several ABC Weekend Specials (notably, Pippi Longstocking) and a CBS Schoolbreak Special.  She was also a writer in 1984 for the TV cartoon series Heathcliff & the Catillac Cats.

In 1986, she shared in the nomination for a Daytime Emmy in the category Outstanding Writing in a Children's Special, for the ABC Weekend Special The Adventures of Con Sawyer and Hucklemary Finn.

Personal life 
She had one child, actress Kimberly Beck, born in Glendale, California, in January 1956.

Cynthia, then still known as Cindy Robbins, married New Jersey singer-songwriter Tommy Leonetti on November 27, 1965, in Beverly Hills, California. The two of them, plus her young daughter, moved to Sydney, Australia, and lived there for the remainder of the 1960s and for most of the 1970s, before returning to America in the late 70's.  Her husband Tommy died in 1979.  She then married writer Robert Parks Chenault in 1983, and began around that time using her married name for her writing credits, rather than her screen name.

References

External links 
 

1937 births
Living people
American television actresses
20th-century American actresses
American film actresses
People from Hammond, Louisiana
Actresses from Louisiana
American television writers
American women television writers
Screenwriters from Louisiana
American stage actresses
21st-century American women